East Coast Bays is a string of small suburbs that form the northernmost part of the North Shore, part of the contiguous Auckland metropolitan area in New Zealand. The suburbs line the north-east coast of the city along the shore of the Hauraki Gulf and Rangitoto Channel. They stretch from Long Bay in the north to Castor Bay in the south. They include, from north to south, Long Bay, Torbay, Waiake Bay, Browns Bay, Rothesay Bay, Murrays Bay, Mairangi Bay, Campbells Bay and Castor Bay.

History 
The land within the modern-day district was originally part of the Mahurangi Block, which extended from Te Arai in the north, all the way to North Head to the south. The land in the district was claimed by several Maōri tribes, through a series of conquests and marriages.

Most settlers in the European settlement of New Zealand established farms in the flat lands of the bays.

With opening of the Auckland Harbour Bridge in 1954, the district experienced rapid growth of population, in 1954, the population was at around 7000, but by 1966, it had increased to 12,000 people, and by 1986, it had risen over 30,000 people living in the East Coast Bays.

Education 
Notable high schools in the area include Long Bay College and Rangitoto College, the largest high school in New Zealand with a school roll of  students as of  Year 9's to 13's ('Form 3 to Form 7') attend the schools.

Politics 

From 1876 until 1954, the area was administered by the Waitemata County, a large rural county north and west of the city of Auckland. In 1954, the area split from the county, forming the East Coast Bays Borough Council, which became East Coast Bays City in 1975. In 1989, the city was merged into the North Shore City. North Shore City was amalgamated into Auckland Council in November 2010.

Within the Auckland Council, East Coast Bays is a part of the Hibiscus and Bays local government area governed by the Hibiscus and Bays Local Board. It is a part of the Albany ward, which elects two councillors to the Auckland Council. The southernmost of the bays, Castor Bay, is a part of the Devonport-Takapuna local government area governed by the Devonport-Takapuna Local Board. It is a part of the North Shore ward, which elects two councillors to the Auckland Council.

East Coast Bays is also the name of an electorate from which an MP is elected to serve in the New Zealand Parliament, which first formed in 1972. Its current MP is Erica Stanford.

References

External links

Hibiscus and Bays Local Board, Auckland Council
Photographs of East Coast Bays held in Auckland Libraries' heritage collections.

 
Former subdivisions of the Auckland Region